Giant earwig may refer to any of the following species of earwigs, all in the suborder Forficulina:

 Labidura herculeana, commonly known as the Saint Helena earwig
 Labidura riparia, commonly known as the tawny earwig
 Titanolabis colossea

Forficulina
Animal common name disambiguation pages